The 2010–11 National League B season was the season played in the National League B, Switzerland's second-tier professional ice hockey league, during 2010 and 2011. HC La Chaux-de-Fonds won the regular season championship, with a nine-point edge over second place EHC Olten. The winner of the playoffs was EHC Visp, the fifth-ranked team of the regular season.

Switzerland
National League B seasons
2010–11 in Swiss ice hockey